Ginkgo gardneri is an extinct ginkgo species in the family Ginkgoaceae from the Paleocene of Ardtun Head, Isle of Mull, Scotland, described in 1936 by Rudolf Florin. This species is very closely related to G. biloba, the only living species of the genus Ginkgo.

References

gardneri
Paleocene plants
Prehistoric trees
Flora of Scotland